Agustin de Legazpi is a prominent historical figure in the Philippines best known as the leader of the Tondo Conspiracy of 1587–1588, the last native ruler of Tondo, and the last individual to hold the title of paramount ruler in any of the Indianized indigenous Tagalog polities of the Pasig River delta, although it had been reduced to little more than a courtesy title by the time of Agustin de Legazpi's execution.

Because the historical sources referring to Agustin de Legazpi were all written by Spanish chroniclers, it is unclear whether he used the title of "Lakan", which was reserved for the paramount ruler of Tondo. Historical sources refer to him using the hispanized name "Don Agustin de Legazpi" instead.

Legazpi is believed to have been the biological son of an unnamed deceased sibling of Rajah Sulayman of Maynila, and was adopted as a son by Sulayman upon the death of Sulayman's own only son sometime in the early days of the Spanish conquest of Luzon. Upon conversion to Roman Catholicism under the new Spanish regime, he is believed to have been sponsored for baptism by Miguel López de Legazpi himself, explaining the similar family names.

Upon the death of Lakandula of Tondo, Agustin de Legazpi was proclaimed to the title of Paramount ruler at Tondo, even though Lakandula had several male children. Lakandula's children served as Datus under Agustin de Legazpi, and two of them – Magat Salamat and Felipe Salonga – joined Agustin de Legazpi in the Tondo Conspiracy. Agustin de Legazpi married Princess Putri of Brunei as he participated in the raid against Brunei in the Castilian War.

As a result of the uncovering of the Tondo Conspiracy, Agustin de Legazpi and Magat Salamat were executed, while Felipe Salonga was sent to exile in South America for eight years.

Historiography 
Aside from his participation in the Tondo Conspiracy of 1587, few definite facts about Agustin de Legazpi's life were documented in 20th Century history textbooks until historian Luciano P.R. Santiago his paper, "The Houses Of Lakandula, Matanda And Soliman (1571-1898)" was published by the Philippine Quarterly of Culture & Society in 1990.  The paper drew from the genealogical documents kept in the Philippines' National Archives (collectively referred to by historians as the "Lacandola Documents") and from the works of earlier historians such as Cesar Adib Majul, who documented the tarsila genealogies of Sulu and Maguindanao, and has since become considered a seminal work on the genealogy of the noble houses of Manila and Tondo.

See also 
Tondo Conspiracy
Paramount rulers in early Philippine history
Magat Salamat
Lacandola Documents

References

1588 deaths
People of Spanish colonial Philippines
Tagalog people
Paramilitary Filipinos